Nathan Woodworth Post (August 3, 1881 – May 30, 1938) was the governor of American Samoa. He graduated from the United States Naval Academy in 1904, and commanded  and the Naval Recruiting Station in Omaha, Nebraska. He served two terms as governor: from March 14 to July 14, 1913 and from October 2 to December 16, 1914. He is the first American Samoan governor to serve to two non-consecutive terms.

Early life
Post was born in Fonda, Iowa on August 3, 1881. His son was Nathan Topliff Post, a United States Marine Corps World War II ace.

Naval career
Post was appointed to the United States Naval Academy from Nebraska in 1900. He graduated in 1904, and served two years as a midshipman at sea before receiving his commission.

Post served as the personnel officer of the 12th Naval District. In 1910, he was in charge of the Naval Recruiting Station in Omaha, Nebraska. He was made a commander in 1916. Post retired from active duty on February 1, 1937.

Governorship
Post relieved William Michael Crose of the governorship on March 14, 1913, serving until July 14 of the same year. He served a second term from October 2 to December 16, 1914. This made him the first Governor of American Samoa to serve exactly two non-consecutive terms; the only other ever to do so was Gatewood Lincoln.

Later life
After his death, Post was interred at San Francisco National Cemetery on June 20, 1938.

References

1881 births
1938 deaths
People from Pocahontas County, Iowa
United States Naval Academy alumni
Military personnel from Iowa
Governors of American Samoa
United States Navy captains
Burials at San Francisco National Cemetery